Belmont is an extinct town in Mississippi County, on the eastern border of the U.S. state of Missouri at the Mississippi River. The GNIS classifies it as a populated place under the name "Belmont Landing".

History
Belmont was platted in 1853, and named after August Belmont, a businessman interested in the site.  A post office called Belmont Landing was in operation from 1867 until 1869, and a post office called Belmont from 1869 until 1923.

Belmont was the scene of a Civil War battle, the Battle of Belmont in 1861. The community lends its name to the Columbus-Belmont State Park, a Civil War site across the Mississippi River in Hickman County, Kentucky.

After the Reconstruction era, whites asserted their dominance, often by violence and intimidation. In May 1905, a mob of 200 to 300 whites lynched Tom Witherspoon, aka Robert Pettigrew, an African-American man, for alleged kidnapping and threats against a white man. This event took place during an era of increased violence by whites against blacks due to economic problems and social tensions. A series of floods (1912, 1922, and 1937) inundated the town of Belmont, particularly the 1937 flood. Many people moved away after this destruction and the town became abandoned; the post office closed in 1923.

References 

Ghost towns in Missouri
Former populated places in Mississippi County, Missouri